The Alan Walker College of Evangelism (AWCE), formerly the Pacific College of Evangelism was a theological college in Sydney, Australia. It was founded by Sir Alan Walker in 1989, and was accredited by the South Pacific Association of Theological Schools.

The college closed in December 2022.

References

Seminaries and theological colleges in New South Wales
Educational institutions established in 1989
1989 establishments in Australia